Downtown Irving/Heritage Crossing station (formerly South Irving Transit Center and later South Irving station) is a Trinity Railway Express commuter rail and bus station in Irving, Texas. It is located on Rock Island Road, east of O'Connor Road. It opened on December 30, 1996, and serves downtown Irving, including the Irving Heritage District and the Irving Civic Center (city offices), which is two blocks west of the station. This station is also served by Dallas Area Rapid Transit (DART).

On July 30, 2012, South Irving station was renamed Downtown Irving/Heritage Crossing station as part of the service changes effective for that date to better reflect new identities created by their evolving neighborhoods or surrounding developments.

Gallery

References

External links
 
 TRE - Downtown Irving/Heritage Crossing Station
 Dallas Area Rapid Transit

Trinity Railway Express stations
South Irving (TRE station)
Railway stations in the United States opened in 1996
Railway stations in Dallas County, Texas
Transportation in Irving, Texas